The International Joseph A. Schumpeter Society (ISS) is an economics association aimed at furthering research in the spirit of Joseph Schumpeter. Wolfgang F. Stolper and Horst Hanusch initiated the foundation of the society in 1986.

The primary objective of the International Joseph Alois Schumpeter Society is the advancement of knowledge in the broad research area of the dynamics of structural change, its origins, and its effects. These topics include studies addressing the role of the dynamic entrepreneur, the political and social problems of entrepreneurship, entrepreneurial history as well as research question concerning income distribution, technical change, and employment. The society welcomes scientifically sound and non-ideological research by scholars of all scholarly traditions. Following Joseph Schumpeter, research should respect "facts as they are and behave and not as one wishes them to be or behave."

The ISS organizes a biannual conference on topics that mirror Schumpeterian ideas, helps financing international conferences, and promotes the dissemination of research through conference proceedings and other publications. Recent scholarly contributions related to Schumpeter are awarded with academic prizes by the ISS. In 1993 the Society adopted the Journal of Evolutionary Economics, founded in 1991, as its house journal.

Presidents 

 Massimo Egidi, Italy (2018–2020)
 Keun Lee, South Korea (2016–2018)
 Jorge Niosi, Canada (2014–2016);
 Uwe Cantner, Germany (2012–2014);
 John Foster, Australia (2010–2012);
 Esben S. Andersen, Denmark (2008–2010);
 Maria da Graça Derengowski Fonseca, Brazil (2006–2008);
 Jean-Luc Gaffard, France (2004–2006);
 Franco Malerba, Italy (2002–2004); 
 Robert F. Lanzillotti, USA (2000–2002);
 J. Stanley Metcalfe, United Kingdom (1998–2000); 
 Dennis C. Mueller, Austria (1996–1998); 
 Gunnar K. Eliasson, Sweden (1994–1996); 
 Ernst Helmstaedter, Germany (1992–1994); 
 Yuichi Shionoya, Japan (1990–1992); 
 F. M. Scherer, USA (1988–1990); 
 Arnold Heertje, The Netherlands (1986–1988)

Schumpeter Prize 
The ISS awards the Schumpeter Prize to distinguished academics in the broad research area of innovation. The following researchers have been awarded with the Schumpeter Prize:

References

External links
 International Joseph A. Schumpeter Society

Economics societies
Joseph Schumpeter
Organizations established in 1986
1986 establishments in Germany